Events in the year 1863 in Iceland.

Incumbents 

 Monarch: Frederick VII of Denmark (until 15 November); Christian IX onwards
 Council President of Denmark: Carl Christian Hall

Events 

 24 February − The National Museum of Iceland is established.

Births 

 1 July − Theodóra Thoroddsen, poet.
 3 December − Thor Philip Axel Jensen, Danish-born Icelandic entrepreneur.

References 

 
1860s in Iceland
Years of the 19th century in Iceland
Iceland
Iceland